Pielavesi is a municipality of Finland. It is part of the Northern Savonia region. The municipality is unilingually Finnish.

Geography
Neighbouring municipalities are Iisalmi, Keitele, Kiuruvesi, Maaninka, Pihtipudas, Pyhäjärvi, and Tervo.

On the north-western side of the village lies lake Pielavesi.

Notable people
Urho Kekkonen, a late President of Finland who ruled the country over two decades, was born in Pielavesi in a log cabin called Lepikon torppa.
Lauri Kokkonen, author and playwright
Ilpo Saastamoinen, musician and composer
Antti Ruuskanen, javelin thrower and Olympic medalist

Pielavesi is also well known for its successful volleyball club, Pielaveden Sampo.

References

External links

Municipality of Pielavesi – Official website